is a special ward located in Tokyo Metropolis, Japan. It takes its name from the Edo River that runs from north to south along the eastern edge of the ward. In English, it uses the name Edogawa City.

The easternmost of the wards, it shares boundaries with the cities of Urayasu and Ichikawa in Chiba Prefecture (to the east) and with the wards of Katsushika (to the north), Sumida and Kōtō (to the west). It meets the city of Matsudo in Chiba at a point.

Edogawa has a sister-city relationship with Gosford, New South Wales, Australia. Domestically, it has friendship ties with the cities of Azumino in Nagano Prefecture and Tsuruoka in Yamagata Prefecture.

As of January 1, 2020, the ward has an estimated population of 695,797, and a population density of 13,925 persons per km².  The total area is 49.90 km².

History

The ward was founded in 1937 with the merger of seven towns and villages in Minami-Katsushika District: the towns of Koiwa and Komatsugawa, and the villages of Kasai, Matsue, Mizue, Shinozaki and Shikamoto.

Climate

Demographics 
Most of the families live here. It is a residential ward.

Districts and neighborhoods

Komatsugawa Area
 Hirai
 Komatsugawa
Matsue Area
 Chūō
 Funabori
 Higashikomatsugawa
 Matsue
 Matsushima
 Nishiichinoe
 Nishikomatsugawachō
 Ōsugi
Mizue Area
 Edogawa
 Haruechō
 Higashimizue
 Ichinoe
 Ichinoechō
 Mizue
 Nīhori
 Ninoechō

Kasai Area
 Higashikasai
 Horichō
 Kitakasai
 Minamikasai
 Nakakasai
 Nishikasai
 Rinkaichō
 Seishinchō
 Ukitachō
Shishibone Area
 Higashimatsumoto
 Hon'isshiki
 Kamiisshiki
 Matsumoto
 Okinomiyachō
 Shishibone
 Shishibonechō
 Yagouchi

Shinozaki Area
 Higashishinozaki
 Higashishinozakimachi
 Kamishinozaki
 Kitashinozaki
 Minamishinozakimachi
 Nishimizue
 Shimoshinozakimachi
 Shinozakimachi
Koiwa Area
 Higashikoiwa
 Kitakoiwa
 Minamikoiwa
 Nishikoiwa

Sites
Edogawa Boat Race Course
Edogawa Stadium
Kasai Seaside Park

Notable people
Seiya Ando, basketball player
Keita Ono, darts player
Akiko Hinagata, actress
Daisuke Matsuzaka, baseball player (played for Seibu Lions and Boston Red Sox)
Hayato Aoki, baseball player
Fuka Nagano, soccer player
Ira Ishida, novelist
Kazuhide Uekusa, former economics professor at Waseda University convicted of sex offences
Kazuya Kamenashi, J-pop idol, singer, actor, television host (member of KAT-TUN)
Kazuyoshi Nakamura, actor
Keizō Kanie, actor
Kenta Suga, actor
Kreva, rapper
Maki Goto, singer (Morning Musume)
Masahiro Yanagida, professional volleyball player
Norikazu Otsuka, announcer
Romi Park, actress and voice actress
Yogendra Puranik, India-born politician
Takamasa Suga, actor
Takeshi Morishima, professional wrestler
Tochinishiki Kiyotaka, 44th yokozuna in sumo
Tomochika Tsuboi, baseball player
Misako Uno, is a Tarento, artist, actress, essayist and talent agent best known as a lead vocalist and dancer of the Co-ed performing arts group AAA.
Yasuo Namekawa,is a Korean–Japanese singer and television personality. He was the vocalist and oldest member of the South Korean hip-hop group M.I.B
Yoshiko Tamura, wrestler
Yūsuke Koide, vocalist and guitarist for Base Ball Bear

Education
Universities
 Aikoku Gakuen Junior College

Metropolitan high schools are operated by the Tokyo Metropolitan Government Board of Education.
 Edogawa High School
 Kasai Commercial High School
 Kasai South High School
 Koiwa High School
 Komatsugawa High School
 Momijigawa High School
 Shinozaki High School

Private High Schools:
 

International schools:
 Global Indian International School, Tokyo Campus

Public elementary and junior high schools are operated by the Edogawa Board of Education (江戸川区教育委員会).

Junior high schools:
 Harue Junior High School (春江中学校)
 Higashi Kasai Junior High School (東葛西中学校)
 Kamiishiki Junior High School (上一色中学校)
 Kasai Junior High School (葛西中学校)
 Kasai No. 2 Junior High School (葛西第二中学校)
 Kasai No. 3 Junior High School (葛西第三中学校)
 Koiwa No. 1 Junior High School (小岩第一中学校)
 Koiwa No. 2 Junior High School (小岩第二中学校)
 Koiwa No. 3 Junior High School (小岩第三中学校)
 Koiwa No. 4 Junior High School (小岩第四中学校)
 Koiwa No. 5 Junior High School (小岩第五中学校)
 Komagatsukawa No. 1 Junior High School (小松川第一中学校)
 Komagatsukawa No. 2 Junior High School (小松川第二中学校)
 Komagatsukawa No. 3 Junior High School (小松川第三中学校)
 Matsue No. 1 Junior High School (松江第一中学校)
 Matsue No. 2 Junior High School (松江第二中学校)
 Matsue No. 3 Junior High School (松江第三中学校)
 Matsue No. 4 Junior High School (松江第四中学校)
 Matsue No. 5 Junior High School (松江第五中学校)
 Matsue No. 6 Junior High School (松江第六中学校)
 Minami Kasai Junior High School (南葛西中学校)
 Minami Kasai No. 2 Junior High School (南葛西第二中学校)
 Mizue Junior High School (瑞江中学校)
 Mizue No. 2 Junior High School (瑞江第二中学校)
 Mizue No. 3 Junior High School (瑞江第三中学校)
 Ninoe Junior High School (二之江中学校)
 Nishi Kasai Junior High School (西葛西中学校)
 Seishin No. 1 Junior High School (清新第一中学校)
 Seishin No. 2 Junior High School (清新第二中学校)
 Shikamoto Junior High School (鹿本中学校)
 Shinozaki Junior High School (篠崎中学校)
 Shinozaki No. 2 Junior High School (篠崎第二中学校)
 Shishibone Junior High School (鹿骨中学校)

Elementary schools:
 No. 2 Kasai Elementary School (第二葛西小学校)
 No. 3 Kasai Elementary School (第三葛西小学校)
 No. 4 Kasai Elementary School (第四葛西小学校)
 No. 5 Kasai Elementary School (第五葛西小学校)
 No. 6 Kasai Elementary School (第六葛西小学校)
 No. 7 Kasai Elementary School (第七葛西小学校)
 No. 2 Matsue Elementary School (第二松江小学校)
 No. 3 Matsue Elementary School (第三松江小学校)
 Edogawa Elementary School (江戸川小学校)
 Funabori Elementary School (船堀小学校)
 Funabori No. 2 Elementary School (船堀第二小学校)
 Harue Elementary School (春江小学校)
 Higashi Kasai Elementary School (東葛西小学校)
 Higashi Koiwa Elementary School (東小岩小学校)
 Higashi-Komatsugawa Elementary School (東小松川小学校)
 Hirai Elementary School (平井小学校)
 Hirai Higashi Elementary School (平井東小学校)
 Hirai Minami Elementary School (平井南小学校)
 Hirai Nishi Elementary School (平井西小学校)
 Hon-Isshiki Elementary School (本一色小学校)
 Ichinoe Elementary School (一之江小学校)
 Ichinoe No. 2 Elementary School (一之江第二小学校)
 Kamata Elementary School (鎌田小学校)
 Kami-Isshiki Minami Elementary School (上一色南小学校)
 Kamikoiwa Elementary School (上小岩小学校)
 Kamikoiwa No. 2 Elementary School (上小岩第二小学校)
 Kasai Elementary School (葛西小学校)
 Kita Koiwa Elementary School (北小岩小学校)
 Koiwa Elementary School (小岩小学校)
 Komagatsugawa Elementary School (小松川小学校)
 Komagatsugawa No. 2 Elementary School (小松川第二小学校)
 Matsue Elementary School (松江小学校)
 Matsumoto Elementary School (松本小学校)
 Minami Kasai Elementary School (南葛西小学校)
 Minami Kasai No. 2 Elementary School (南葛西第二小学校)
 Minami Kasai No. 3 Elementary School (南葛西第三小学校)
 Minami Koiwa Elementary School (南小岩小学校)
 Minami Koiwa No. 2 Elementary School (南小岩第二小学校)
 Minami Shinozaki Elementary School (南篠崎小学校)
 Mizue Elementary School (瑞江小学校)
 Naka Koiwa Elementary School (中小岩小学校)
 Niihori Elementary School (新堀小学校)
 Ninoe Elementary School (二之江小学校)
 Ninoe No. 2 Elementary School (二之江第二小学校)
 Ninoe No. 3 Elementary School (二之江第三小学校)
 Nishiichinoe Elementary School (西一之江小学校)
 Nishi Kasai Elementary School (西葛西小学校)
 Nishi Koiwa Elementary School (西小岩小学校)
 Nishikomatsugawa Elementary School (西小松川小学校)
 Osugi Elementary School (大杉小学校)
 Osugi No. 2 Elementary School (大杉第二小学校)
 Osugi Higashi Elementary School (大杉東小学校)
 Rinkai Elementary School (臨海小学校)
 Seishin No. 1 Elementary School (清新第一小学校)
 Seishin Futaba Elementary School (清新ふたば小学校)
 Shikamoto Elementary School (鹿本小学校)
 Shimokamata Elementary School (下鎌田小学校)
 Shimokamata Higashi Elementary School (下鎌田東小学校)
 Shimokamata Nishi Elementary School (下鎌田西小学校)
 Shimokoiwa Elementary School (下小岩小学校)
 Shimokoiwa No. 2 Elementary School (下小岩第二小学校)
 Shinden Elementary School (新田小学校)
 Shinozaki Elementary School (篠崎小学校)
 Shinozaki No. 2 Elementary School (篠崎第二小学校)
 Shinozaki No. 3 Elementary School (篠崎第三小学校)
 Shinozaki No. 4 Elementary School (篠崎第四小学校)
 Shinozaki No. 5 Elementary School (篠崎第五小学校)
 Shishibone Elementary School (鹿骨小学校)
 Shishibone Higashi Elementary School (鹿骨東小学校)
 Ukita Elementary School (宇喜田小学校)

Transportation

Rail
  East Japan Railway Company
  Chūō-Sōbu Line
 –  – (Shin-Koiwa Station is in Katsushika, Tokyo) –  –
  Keiyō Line
 –  –
  Keisei Electric Railway
  Keisei Main Line
 –  –  –
  Toei
  Toei Shinjuku Line
 –  –  –  –  –  –
  Tokyo Metro
  Tozai Line
 –  –  –

Highway
Shuto Expressway
C2 Central Loop
No.7 Komatsugawa Route
B Bayshore Route

See also

References

External links

Edogawa City Official Website 

 
Wards of Tokyo